Ulaysha or Ulaisha is a residential neighborhood and a subject of Baladiyah al-Shumaisi in south-western Riyadh, Saudi Arabia. Bordered by al-Badiah neighborhood to the south, al-Rafiah neighborhood to the west, al-Fakhiriyyah neighborhood to the north and al-Shumaysi, Umm Salim and al-Wisham neighborhoods to the east, it is considered to part of the old city area.

References 

Neighbourhoods in Riyadh
Baladiyahs of Riyadh